This is a '''list of mayors of St. Catharines, Ontario.

Mayors

References

Saint Catharines